ROSAT (short for Röntgensatellit; in German X-rays are called Röntgenstrahlen, in honour of Wilhelm Röntgen) was a German Aerospace Center-led satellite X-ray telescope, with instruments built by West Germany, the United Kingdom and the United States. It was launched on 1 June 1990, on a Delta II rocket from Cape Canaveral, on what was initially designed as an 18-month mission, with provision for up to five years of operation. ROSAT operated for over eight years, finally shutting down on 12 February 1999.

In February 2011, it was reported that the  satellite was unlikely to burn up entirely while re-entering the Earth's atmosphere due to the large amount of ceramics and glass used in construction. Parts as heavy as  could impact the surface. ROSAT eventually re-entered the Earth's atmosphere on 23 October 2011 over Bay of Bengal.

Overview 
According to NASA, the Roentgensatellit (ROSAT) was a joint German, U.S. and British X-ray astrophysics project. ROSAT carried a German-built imaging X-ray Telescope (XRT) with three focal plane instruments: two German Position Sensitive Proportional Counters (PSPC) and the US-supplied High Resolution Imager (HRI). The X-ray mirror assembly was a grazing incidence four-fold nested Wolter I telescope with an 84-cm diameter aperture and 240-cm focal length. The angular resolution was less than 5 arcsecond at half energy width (the "angle within which half of the electromagnetic radiation" is focused). The XRT assembly was sensitive to X-rays between 0.1 and 2 keV (one thousand Electronvolt).

In addition, a British-supplied extreme ultraviolet (XUV) telescope, the Wide Field Camera (WFC), was coaligned with the XRT and covered the energy band from 0.042 to 0.21 keV (30 to 6 nm).

ROSAT's unique strengths were high spatial resolution, low-background, soft X-ray imaging for the study of the structure of low surface brightness features, and for low-resolution spectroscopy.

The ROSAT spacecraft was a three-axis stabilized satellite which can be used for pointed observations, for slewing between targets, and for performing scanning observations on great circles perpendicular to the plane of the ecliptic. ROSAT was capable of fast slews (180 deg. in ~15 min.) which makes it possible to observe two targets on opposite hemispheres during each orbit. The pointing accuracy was 1 arcminute with stability less than 5 arcsec per sec and jitter radius of ~10 arcsec. Two CCD star sensors were used for optical position sensing of guide stars and attitude determination of the spacecraft. The post facto attitude determination accuracy was 6 arcsec.

The ROSAT mission was divided into two phases:
 After a two-month on-orbit calibration and verification period, an all-sky survey was performed for six months using the PSPC in the focus of XRT, and in two XUV bands using the WFC. The survey was carried out in the scan mode.
 The second phase consists of the remainder of the mission and was devoted to pointed observations of selected astrophysical sources. In ROSAT's pointed phase, observing time was allocated to Guest Investigators from all three participating countries through peer review of submitted proposals. ROSAT had a design life of 18 months, but was expected to operate beyond its nominal lifetime.

Instruments

X-ray Telescope (XRT) 
The main assembly was a German-built imaging X-ray Telescope (XRT) with three focal plane instruments: two German Position Sensitive Proportional Counters (PSPC) and the US-supplied High Resolution Imager (HRI). The X-ray mirror assembly was a grazing incidence four-fold nested Wolter I telescope  with an  diameter aperture and  focal length. The angular resolution was less than 5 arcsec at half energy width. The XRT assembly was sensitive to X-rays between 0.1 and 2 keV.

Position Sensitive Proportional Counters (two) (PSPC) 

Each Position Sensitive Proportional Counter (PSPC) is a thin-window gas counter. Each incoming X-ray photon produces an electron cloud whose position and charge are detected using two wire grids. The photon position is determined with an accuracy of about 120 micrometers. The electron cloud's charge corresponds to the photon energy, with a nominal spectral bandpass 0.1-2.4 keV.

High Resolution Imager (HRI) 

The US-supplied High Resolution Imager used a crossed grid detector with a position accuracy to 25 micrometers. The instrument was damaged by solar exposure on 20 September 1998.

Wide Field Camera (WFC) 

The Wide Field Camera (WFC) was a UK-supplied extreme ultraviolet (XUV) telescope co-aligned with the XRT and covered the wave band between 300 and 60 angstroms (0.042 to 0.21 keV).

Highlights

 X-ray all-sky survey catalog, more than 150,000 objects
 XUV all-sky survey catalog (479 objects)
 Source catalogs from the pointed phase (PSPC and HRI) containing ~ 100,000 serendipitous sources
 Detailed morphology of supernova remnants and clusters of galaxies.
 Detection of shadowing of diffuse X-ray emission by molecular clouds.
 Detection of pulsations from Geminga.
 Detection of isolated neutron stars.
 Discovery of X-ray emission from comets.
 Observation of X-ray emission from the collision of Comet Shoemaker-Levy with Jupiter.

Catalogues
 1RXS – an acronym which is the prefix used for the First ROSAT X-ray Survey (1st ROSAT X-ray Survey), a catalogue of astronomical objects visible for ROSAT in the X-ray spectrum.

See also :Category:ROSAT objects

Launch 
ROSAT was originally planned to be launched on the Space Shuttle but the Challenger disaster caused it to be moved to the Delta platform. This move made it impossible to recapture ROSAT with a Shuttle and bring it back to Earth.

End of operations 
Originally designed for a five-year mission, ROSAT continued in its extended mission for a further four years before equipment failure forced an end to the mission. For some months after this, ROSAT completed its very last observations before being finally switched off on 12 February 1999.

On 25 April 1998, failure of the primary star tracker on the X-ray Telescope led to pointing errors that in turn had caused solar overheating. A contingency plan and the necessary software had already been developed to utilise an alternative star tracker attached to the Wide Field Camera.

ROSAT was soon operational again, but with some restrictions to the effectiveness of its tracking and thus its control. It was severely damaged on 20 September 1998 when a reaction wheel in the spacecraft's Attitude Measuring and Control System reached its maximum rotational speed, losing control of a slew, damaging the High Resolution Imager by exposure to the sun. This failure was initially attributed to the difficulties of controlling the satellite under these difficult circumstances outside its initial design parameters.

Allegations of cyber-attacks causing the failure 
In 2008, NASA investigators were reported to have found that the ROSAT failure was linked to a cyber-intrusion at Goddard Space Flight Center. This was also reported through Bruce Schneier's blog, a highly regarded commentary on IT security issues.

The root of this allegation is a 1999 advisory report by Thomas Talleur, senior investigator for cyber-security at NASA. This advisory is reported to describe a series of attacks from Russia that reached computers in the X-ray Astrophysics Section (i.e. ROSAT's) at Goddard, and took control of computers used for the control of satellites, not just a passive "snooping" attack. The advisory stated: "Hostile activities compromised [NASA] computer systems that directly and indirectly deal with the design, testing, and transferring of satellite package command-and-control codes."

The advisory is further reported as claiming that the ROSAT incident was "coincident with the intrusion" and that, "Operational characteristics and commanding of the ROSAT were sufficiently similar to other space assets to provide intruders with valuable information about how such platforms are commanded,". Without public access to the advisory, it is obviously impossible to comment in detail. Even if it did describe a real intrusion, there is a plausible "no attack" explanation for ROSAT's failure, and the report is claimed to link the two incidents as no more than "coincident." However, NASA officials in charge of the day-to-day operations of the ROSAT mission at Goddard, including GSFC Rosat Project Scientist Rob Petre, say definitively that no such incident occurred. Talleur's information appears to have come from one of his interns who exaggerated a hacking incident on an office computer not related to flight operations.

IT security remains a significant issue for NASA.  Other systems including the Earth Observing System have also been attacked.

Re-entry 

On 23 October 2011 ROSAT re-entered the Earth's atmosphere sometime between 1:45 UTC and 2:15 UTC over the Bay of Bengal, east of India. There was no confirmation if pieces of debris had reached the Earth's surface.

Successor 

eROSITA launched on board the Russian-German Spektr-RG space observatory in 2019. It will provide an updated all-sky survey of the X-ray sky, extending the energy range to 10keV, increase the sensitivity by a factor of 25 and improve the spatial and spectral resolution.

Notes

References

See also

List of X-ray space telescopes

External links

 
 
 
 
 1RXS Catalog site 
MPE – ROSAT Development

Spacecraft which reentered in 2011
Space telescopes
X-ray telescopes
Satellites of Germany

Spacecraft launched in 1990